Udea kusnezovi is a moth in the family Crambidae. It is found in Russia.

References

Moths described in 2008
kusnezovi